Eleni Markou (born 29 March 1995) is a Greek footballer who plays for Swiss Super League club FC Zürich and the Greece national team.

International goals

Honours 
PAOK
 A Division (5): 2013, 2015, 2016, 2017, 2018
 Greek Cup (5): 2013, 2014, 2015, 2016, 2017

Monroe Community College
 NJCAA Region III Division I: 2016

Apollon Ladies
 Cypriot First Division (1): 2018/19

Individual
 WNYAC Co-Freshman Female Athlete of the Year: 2016
 NJCAA Region III Player of the Year: 2016
 NSCAA National Player of the Year: 2016
 NJCAA Division I Women's Soccer First-Team All-American: 2016
 NSCAA Junior College Division I Women’s First-Team All-American: 2016

References

External links 
 

1995 births
Living people
Women's association football forwards
Greek women's footballers
Greece women's international footballers
Apollon Ladies F.C. players
Greek expatriate women's footballers
Greek expatriate sportspeople in Cyprus
Expatriate women's footballers in Cyprus
Footballers from Kastoria